Clara Rugaard (born 5 December 1997) is a Danish actress and singer.

Early life
Rugaard was born in Copenhagen to a Danish father and a Northern Irish mother. Her father is in the Royal Danish Navy. She moved to London with her parents when her father was transferred there and stayed on when they moved back to Denmark.

Career
Rugaard made her film debut in the 2013 Danish movie Min søsters børn i Afrika. Prior to this, she was known for singing the Danish theme song to Violetta for the Disney Channel. She also provided the English singing voice for Violetta (played by Martina Stoessel). Since her acting debut, she has appeared in the television series The Lodge and Still Star-Crossed, and multiple films, including Good Favour, Teen Spirit, and I Am Mother. Rugaard stars opposite Lewis Pullman, Danny Glover, and Lyrica Okano in the American film Press Play, directed by Greg Björkman.

She has received favorable reviews of her performance in I Am Mother, with SyFy describing her as the "heart, hope and humanity" of the film and The New York Post describing her as "a new sci-fi star".

Filmography

Film

Television

References

External links

 
 Clara Rugaard on Twitter
 Clara Rugaard on Instagram

Living people
1997 births
21st-century Danish singers
21st-century Danish actresses
Danish expatriates in England
Danish people of Irish descent